Unconventional (oil & gas) reservoirs, or unconventional resources (resource plays) are accumulations where oil & gas phases are tightly bound to the rock fabric by strong capillary forces, requiring specialised measures for evaluation and extraction.

Conventional reservoir

Oil and gas are generated naturally at depths of around 4 or 5 kms below Earth’s surface.  Being lighter than the water, which saturates rocks below the water table, the oil and gas percolate up through aquifer pathways towards Earth's surface (through time) by buoyancy.  Some of the oil and gas percolate all the way to the surface as natural seepages, either on land or on the sea floor.  The rest remain trapped underground where the oil and gas are prevented from reaching the surface by geological barriers, in a range of trap geometries.  In this way, underground pockets of oil & gas accumulate by displacing water in porous rock, which, if permeable, are referred to as conventional reservoirs. A well drilled into these reservoirs normally flow oil and gas through natural buoyancy, driven to the well bore where pressure differences are relatively high. Where the pressures are low, flow can be assisted with pumps (e.g. nodding donkeys).

The rise of unconventional reservoirs
In the early days of the oil industry, there was no need for stimulation to produce "every last drop" of oil from the ground, simply because supply vastly outstripped demand and leaving "difficult" oil in the ground was economically expedient.  Two world wars, followed by huge economic growth, changed all of that.  While demand for cheap portable energy soared, the availability of new conventional oil and gas resources declined.   The industry initially sought to enhance recovery of trapped oil and gas, using techniques like restricted, or low volume hydraulic fracturing to stimulate the reservoir further, thereby reducing the volume of oil and gas left in the ground to an economic minimum.  By the turn of the millennium, a new kind of energy resource was required, particularly by the USA, who were driven to achieve energy independence.  The USA turned to unconventional reservoirs to achieve their goals, which had been known about for decades but had previously been too costly to be economically attractive.  The gamble worked.  Today, unconventional reservoirs include basin-centered gas, shale gas, coalbed methane (CBM),  gas hydrates, tar sands, light tight oil and oil shale, mostly from North America.

Essential differences between conventional and unconventional reservoirs
The distinction between conventional and unconventional resources reflects differences in the qualities of the reservoir and/or the physical properties of the oil and gas (i.e. permeability and/or viscosity). These characteristics significantly impact predictability (risk to find, appraise and develop) and in turn the methods of extraction from those reservoirs such as fracking.

Conventional oil & gas accumulations are concentrated by buoyancy driven aquifer pathways into discrete geological traps, which are detectable from the surface.  These traps constitute relatively small but high resource density fields. Most conventional oil or gas fields initially flow naturally by buoyancy alone into the well bore, with their limits defined by fluid mechanics measurable from the well bore (e.g. fluid pressure, OWC/GWC etc.).  In general, the technical and commercial risk associated with discrete conventional reservoirs can be reduced using relatively inexpensive remote techniques such as reflection seismology and extracted with relatively few appraisal and development wells.

Unconventional reservoirs, in contrast, are regionally dispersed over large areas with no indicative trap geometry that can be used for predictive purposes.  The oil and gas in unconventional reservoirs are generally low density resources, frequently trapped in the rock by strong capillary forces incapable of flowing naturally through buoyancy.  The limits of an unconventional field are therefore usually defined by relatively expensive well testing for delivery.  Extraction from unconventional reservoirs requires changing the physical properties of the reservoir, or the flow characteristics of the fluid, using techniques such as fraccing or steam injection. The technical and commercial risk associated with unconventional reservoirs is generally higher than conventional reservoirs owing to the lack of predictability of the trap extent and of the reservoir quality, which requires extensive well placement and testing to determine the economic reserves/well limit defined by well delivery.

Environmental differences
As with all forms of fossil fuel, there are established issues with greenhouse gas emissions through export (distribution) as well as consumption (combustion), which are identical whether the oil or gas are derived from conventional or unconventional reservoirs.  Their carbon footprints, however, are radically different: conventional reservoirs use the natural energy in the environment to flow oil and gas to the surface unaided; unconventional reservoirs require putting energy into the ground for extraction, either as heat (e.g. tar sands and oil shales) or as pressure (e.g. shale gas and CBM).  The artificial transfer of heat and pressure require the use of large volumes of fresh water creating supply and disposal issues.  The distribution of the resource over large areas creates land use issues, with implications for local communities on infrastructure, freight traffic and local economies.  Impact on the environment is an unavoidable consequence of all human activity but the difference between the impact of conventional reservoirs compared with unconventional is significant, measurable and predictable.

See also

Unconventional gas
Unconventional oil
Source rock
Petroleum trap
Fracking in the United States
Coalbed methane
Methane clathrate (gas hydrate)
Shale gas
Synthetic natural gas, such as oil shale gas
Tight gas
Oil sand
Tight oil
Extreme energy
Renewable energy
Future energy development
Hubbert peak
Energy development
Alternative fuels
World energy resources and consumption
Oil megaprojects

References and notes

Notes

Abbreviated definitions

Petroleum industry
Unconventional oil
Unconventional gas
Peak oil
Petroleum production
Petroleum geology
Reservoir rock formations